Heliconius comprises a colorful and widespread genus of brush-footed butterflies commonly known as the longwings or heliconians. This genus is distributed throughout the tropical and subtropical regions of the New World, from South America as far north as the southern United States. The larvae of these butterflies eat passion flower vines (Passifloraceae).  Adults exhibit bright wing color patterns which signal their distastefulness to potential predators.

Brought to the forefront of scientific attention by Victorian naturalists, these butterflies exhibit a striking diversity and mimicry, both amongst themselves and with species in other groups of butterflies and moths.  The study of Heliconius and other groups of mimetic butterflies allowed the English naturalist Henry Walter Bates, following his return from Brazil in 1859, to lend support to Charles Darwin, who had found similar diversity amongst the Galápagos finches.

Model for evolutionary study 

Heliconius butterflies have been a subject of many studies, due partly to their abundance and the relative ease of breeding them under laboratory conditions, but also because of the extensive mimicry that occurs in this group. From the nineteenth century to the present day, their study has helped scientists to understand how new species are formed and why nature is so diverse. In particular, the genus is suitable for the study of both Batesian mimicry and Müllerian mimicry.

Because of the type of plant material that Heliconius caterpillars favor and the resulting poisons they store in their tissues, the adult butterflies are usually unpalatable to predators. This warning is announced, to the mutual benefit of both parties, by bright colors and contrasting wing patterns, a phenomenon known as aposematism. Heliconius butterflies are thus Müllerian mimics of one another, and are also involved in Müllerian mimicry with various species of Ithomiini, Danaini, Riodinidae (Ithomeis and Stalachtis) and Acraeini as well as pericopine arctiid moths.  They are probably the models for various palatable Batesian mimics, including Papilio zagreus and various Phyciodina.

Convergence 

Heliconius butterflies such as Heliconius numata are famous practitioners of Müllerian mimicry, and benefit from mimicking other unpalatable species of butterfly in their local habitat, such as Melinaea. This type of mimicry typically results in convergent evolution, whereby many (sometimes unrelated) species become protected by similar patterns or coloration. This is a distinct strategy from the better-known Batesian mimicry. In Batesian mimics defensive coloration or patterns are a bluff, mimicking those of actually poisonous or foul-tasting species. In Müllerian mimicry all species of the set have honest warnings, but the similarity between members of a set allows a single encounter between a predator and one member of the set to deter that predator in all future encounters with all members of the set. In this way multiple, often unrelated species, effectively cooperate with one another to educate their mutual predators.

Work has been done to understand the genetic changes responsible for the convergent evolution of wing patterns in comimetic species. Molecular work on two distantly related Heliconius comimics, Heliconius melpomene and Heliconius erato, has revealed that homologous genomic regions in the species are responsible for the convergence in wing patterns. Also, Supple had found evidence of two co-mimics H. erato and H. melpomene having no shared single-nucleotide polymorphisms (SNPs), which would be indicative of introgression, and hypothesized the same regulatory genes for color/pattern had comparably changed in response to the same selective forces. Similarly, molecular evidence indicates that Heliconius numata shares the same patterning homologues, but that these loci are locked into a wing patterning supergene that results in a lack of recombination and a finite set of wing pattern morphs.

One puzzle with Müllerian mimicry/convergence is that it would be predicted the butterflies to all eventually converge on the same color and pattern for the highest predator education. Instead, Heliconius butterflies are greatly diverse and even form multiple 'mimicry rings' within the same geographical area. Additional evolutionary forces are likely at work.

Speciation 

Heliconius butterflies are models for the study of speciation. Hybrid speciation has been hypothesized to occur in this genus and may contribute to the diverse mimicry found in Heliconius butterflies. It has been proposed that two closely related species, H. cydno and H. melpomene, hybridized to create the species H. heurippa. In addition, the clade containing Heliconius erato radiated before Heliconius melpomene, establishing the wing pattern diversity found in both species of butterfly. In a DNA sequencing comparison involving species H. m. aglope, H. timareta, and H. m. amaryllis, it was found that gene sequences around mimicry loci were more recently diverged in comparison with the rest of the genome, providing evidence for speciation by hybridization over speciation by ancestral polymorphism.

Hybridization is correlated with introgression.  Results from Supple and her team have shown SNP's being polymorphic mostly around hybrid zones of a genome, and they claimed this supported the mechanism of introgression over ancestral variation for genetic material exchange for certain species. Selection factors can drive introgression to revolve around genes correlated with wing pattern and color. Research has shown introgression centering on two known chromosomes that contain mimicry alleles.

Assortive mating reproductively isolates H. heurippa from its parental species. Melo did a study on the hybrid H. heurippa to determine its mating habits regarding preference between other hybrids and its parental species. The results showed H. heurippa chose to reproduce via backcrossing, while the parental species were highly unlikely to reproduce with the backcrosses.  This is significant, because hybrids' mating behavior would relatively quickly isolate itself from its parental species, and eventually form a species itself, as defined by lack of gene flow.  His team also hypothesized that along with a mixed inheritance of color and pattern, the hybrids also obtained a mixed preference for mates from their parental species genes.  The H. heurippa likely had a genetic attraction for other hybrids, leading to its reproductive isolation and speciation.

Although rare, Heliconius butterflies are an example of homoploid hybrid speciation, i.e. hybridization without changing the number of chromosomes. Aposematism, using warning colors, has been noted to improve species diversification, which may also contribute to the wide range of Heliconius butterflies.

Sexual selection of aposematic colors

For aposematism and mimicry to be successful in the butterflies, they must continually evolve their colours to warn predators of their unpalatability. Sexual selection is important in maintaining aposematism, as it helps to select for specific shades of colours rather than general colors. A research team used techniques to determine some the color qualities of a set of butterflies.  They found that color was more vivid on the dorsal side of the butterflies than on the ventral.  Also, in comparing the sexes, females appeared to have differing brightness in specific spots. It is important to select for specific colors to avoid subtle shades in any of the species involved in the mimicry. Unsuccessful warning colors will reduce the efficiency of the aposematism. To select for specific colours, neural receptors in the butterflies' brains give a disproportionate recognition and selection to those shades. To test the importance of these neural and visual cues in the butterflies, researchers conducted an experiment wherein they eliminated colours from butterflies' wings.  When a colour was eliminated, the butterfly was less successful in attracting mates and therefore did not reproduce as much as its counterparts

Sexual Selection of Pheromones 
In order to attract mates female Heliconius secrete pheromones from a yellow like sac that they secrete the scent to appear more attractive to the males. They found that typically it is virgin female Heliconius that secrete these pheromones, The males are able to attach themselves using their denticles to these secretion sacs during mating in order to ensure secretion. Pheromones are vital when it comes to mate choice it determines the more likely chance that there will be a success in mating between the Heliconius. There is an reproductive isolation between populations so while mates are attracted by pheromones they still will choose to similar patterned winged Heliconius.

Mating and offspring 

Heliconius has evolved two forms of mating. The main form is standard sexual reproduction. Some species of Heliconius, however, have converged evolutionarily in regard to pupal mating. One species to exhibit this behavior is Heliconius charithonia.  In this form of mating, the male Heliconius finds a female pupa and waits until a day before she is moulted to mate with her. With this type of mating there is no sexual selection present. H. erato has a unique mating ritual, in which males transfer anti-aphrodisiac pheromones to females after copulation so that no other males will approach the mated females. No other Lepidoptera exhibit this behavior.

Heliconius female butterflies also disperse their eggs much more slowly than other species of butterflies. They obtain their nutrients for egg production through pollen in the adult stage rather than the larval stage. Due to nutrient collection in the adult rather than larval stage, adult females have a much longer life than other species, which allows them to better disperse their eggs for survival and speciation. This form of egg production is helpful because larvae are much more vulnerable than adult stages, although they also utilize aposematism. Because many of the nutrients needed to produce eggs are obtained in the adult stage, the larval stage is much shorter and less susceptible to predation.

Cyanic characteristics 
In order to be unpalatable, the Heliconius butterflies use cyanic characteristics, meaning they produce substances that have a cyanide group attached to them, ultimately making them harmful. Research has found that the amino acids needed to make the cyanic compounds come from feeding on pollen. Although feeding on pollen takes longer than nectar feeding, the aposematic characteristics help to warn predators away and give them more time for feeding. While Heliconius larvae feed on Passifloraceae which also have cyanic characteristics, the larvae have evolved the ability to neutralize cyanic molecules to protect them from the negative effects of the plant.

Species 

Most current researchers agree that there are some 39 Heliconius species. These are listed alphabetically here, according to Gerardo Lamas' (2004) checklist. Note that the subspecific nomenclature is incomplete for many species (there are over 2000 published names associated with the genus, many of which are subjective synonyms or infrasubspecific names).

 Heliconius Kluk, 1802
 Heliconius antiochus (Linnaeus, 1767) – Antiochus longwing

 Heliconius aoede (Hübner, [1813]) – Aoede longwing
 Heliconius astraea Staudinger, 1897
 Heliconius atthis Doubleday, 1847 – Atthis longwing or false zebra longwing
 Heliconius besckei Ménétriés, 1857
 Heliconius burneyi (Hübner, 1816) – Burney's longwing

 Heliconius charithonia (Linnaeus, 1767) – zebra longwing

 Heliconius clysonymus Latreille, 1817 – Clysonymus longwing, montane longwing

 Heliconius congener Weymer, 1890
 Heliconius cydno (Doubleday, 1847) – cydno longwing

 Heliconius demeter Staudinger, 1897 – Demeter longwing

 Heliconius doris (Linnaeus, 1771) – Doris longwing or Doris
 Heliconius egeria (Cramer, 1775)

 Heliconius eleuchia Hewitson, 1853 – white-edged longwing or eleuchia longwing

 Heliconius elevatus Nöldner, 1901

 Heliconius erato (Linnaeus, 1764) – crimson-patched longwing, red postman

 Heliconius eratosignis (Joicey & Talbot, 1925)

 Heliconius ethilla (Godart, 1819) – Ethilia longwing

 Heliconius godmani Staudinger, 1882
 Heliconius hecale (Fabricius, 1775) – tiger longwing or Hecale longwing

 Heliconius hecalesia Hewitson, 1853 – five-spotted longwing

 Heliconius hecuba (Hewitson, [1858]) – Hecuba longwing

 Heliconius hermathena (Hewitson, 1853) – Hermathena longwing

 Heliconius heurippa (Hewitson, 1853)
 Heliconius hewitsoni Staudinger, 1875
 Heliconius hierax Hewitson, 1869
 Heliconius himera Hewitson, 1867
 Heliconius hortense Guérin, [1844] – Mexican longwing or mountain longwing
 Heliconius ismenius Latreille, [1817] – Ismenius tiger or tiger helconian

 Heliconius lalitae Brévignon, 1996
 Heliconius leucadia (Bates, 1862) – Leucadia longwing

 Heliconius melpomene (Linnaeus, 1758) – (common) postman
 Heliconius metharme (Erichson, [1849])
 Heliconius metis (Moreira & Mielke, 2010)
 Heliconius nattereri Felder, 1865 – Natterer's longwing
 Heliconius numata (Cramer, 1780) – Numata longwing

 Heliconius pachinus Salvin, 1871 – pachinus longwing
 Heliconius pardalinus (Bates, 1862)

 Heliconius peruvianus Felder – Peruvian longwing
 Heliconius ricini (Linnaeus, 1758) – ricini longwing
 Heliconius sapho (Drury, 1782) – Sapho longwing

 Heliconius sara (Fabricius, 1793) – Sara longwing

 Heliconius sergestus (Weymer, 1894)
 Heliconius telesiphe Doubleday, 1847 – telesiphe longwing

 Heliconius timareta (Hewitson, 1867)
 Heliconius tristero Brower, 1996
 Heliconius wallacei Reakirt, 1866 – Wallace's longwing

 Heliconius xanthocles Bates, 1862

References

Further reading 

 Holzinger, H. and Holzinger, R, 1994. Heliconius and related genera. Sciences Nat, Venette, pp. 1–328, pl. 1–51

External links 

 Heliconius Research Worldwide
Michel Cast La La diversité des Heliconius
 Tree of Life: Heliconius
 Checklist of Heliconiini with links to maps
 Neil Rosser et al.: Source geographic distribution data for the species
 

 
Heliconiini
Nymphalidae of South America
Nymphalidae genera
Taxa named by Jan Krzysztof Kluk